The 2nd Military Region of the Vietnam People's Army, is directly under the Ministry of Defence of Vietnam, tasked to organise, build, manage and commander armed forces defending the North West of Vietnam. The north-West region of Vietnam, borders with the Yunnan of China. In 1979, Chinese army with 3 infantry corps, 10 infantry divisions, launched a huge invasion in this military zone, and occupied Lào Cai Province and Phong Thổ.

 Command Headquarters: Việt Trì city in Phú Thọ Province
 Commander: Major General Phạm Hồng Chương  
 Political Commissar:  Lieutenant General Phạm Đức Duyên 
 Deputy Commander cum Chief of Staff Commander: Major General Nguyễn Đăng Khải

Agencies
× Headquarters of Staff 
 Logistics Department 
 Technical Department 
 Department of Politics

Units
 Military Command of Sơn La Province. 
 Military Command of Lai Châu Province. 
 Military Command of Lào Cai Province. 
 Military Command of Điện Biên Province
 Military Command of Yên Bái Province
 Military Command of Hà Giang Province 
 Military Command of Tuyên Quang Province 
 Military Command of Phú Thọ Province 
 Military Command of Vĩnh Phúc Province 
 Military School of Military Zone (in Vĩnh Yên City of Vĩnh Phúc Province)
 316th Infantry Division (located in Chí Đám, Đoan Hùng county, Phú Thọ province) 
 355th Infantry Division (in Yên Bái Province) 
 82nd Infantry Regiment (in Điện Biên Province) 
 406th Tank Regiment (in Hạ Hòa county of Phú Thọ Province) 
 604th Information Regiment (in Việt Trì city of Phú Thọ Province) 
 297th Anti-Aircraft Brigade (in Việt Trì city of Phú Thọ Province) 
 543rd Combat Engineering Brigade (in Thanh Thủy county of Phú Thọ Province)  
 313rd Defence Economics Division 
 314th Defence Economics Division 
 326th Defence Economics Division (in Sốp Cộp of Sơn La Province)
 345th Defence Economics Division - during the 1979 Sino-Vietnamese War, the 345th Division, which had recently converted from an economic construction division to a fighting division, was located at Bao Thang, across from Yunan Province.
 379th Defence Economics Division (in Điện Biên Province)

Successive Commander and Leadership

Commander
 Major General (1974), Lieutenant General (1980), Colonel General (1984) Vũ Lập (1978-1987): 
 Lieutenant General Ma Thanh Toàn (-2007) 
 Lieutenant General Đỗ Bá Tỵ (2007-2010)  
 Major General Dương Đức Hòa  (2010-2016)
 Major General Lê Xuân Duy  (2016-2016)
 Lieutenant General Phùng Sĩ Tấn  (2016-2019)
 Major General Phạm Hồng Chương  (2019-present)

Political Commissioner
 Major General (1974), Lieutenant General (1980), Vũ Lập (1978-1981)
 Lieutenant General Trần Thụ (Deputy Commander of political) 
 Lieutenant General Lê Minh Cược (2006-2009)
 Lieutenant General Nguyễn Ngọc Liên (2009-2015)
 Major General Lê Hiền Vân (2015-2016)
 Lieutenant General Trịnh Văn Quyết (2016-2021)
 Lieutenant General Phạm Đức Duyên (2021-present)

References

Military regions of the People's Army of Vietnam